Giovanni Fontana (1537 – 5 July 1611) was a Roman Catholic prelate who served as Bishop of Ferrara (1590–1611) 
and Titular Bishop of Nicopolis in Palaestina (1589–1590).

Biography
Giovanni Fontana was born in Vignola, Italy in 1537.
On 11 September 1589, he was appointed during the papacy of Pope Sixtus V as Coadjutor Bishop of Ferrara and Titular Bishop of  Nicopolis in Palaestina 
On 11 September 1589, he was consecrated bishop by Gaspare Visconti, Archbishop of Milan, with Gerolamo Ragazzoni, Bishop of Bergamo, and Ludovico Taverna, Bishop of Lodi, serving as co-consecrators. 
On 7 August 1590, he succeeded as Bishop of Ferrara. 
He served as Bishop of Ferrara until his death on 5 July 1611.

While bishop, he was the principal consecrator of Alfonso Paleotti, Coadjutor Archbishop of Bologna (1591); and the principal co-consecrator of Orazio Giraldi, Bishop of Comacchio (1592), and Camillo Beccio, Bishop of Acqui (1599)

References

External links and additional sources
 (for Chronology of Bishops) 
 (for Chronology of Bishops) 
 (for Chronology of Bishops) 
 (for Chronology of Bishops) 

16th-century Italian Roman Catholic bishops
17th-century Italian Roman Catholic bishops
Bishops appointed by Pope Sixtus V
1537 births
1611 deaths